Samuel Portillo Gómez (born 2 May 1994) is an Argentine-Paraguayan professional footballer who plays as a striker for Argentine club Deportivo Riestra.

Career

Early life
Originally from Itaguá in Paraguay, Portillo migrated to Argentina, where he became a painter. His brother contracted him to work in the city of La Plata. In Argentina, Portillo played in the Liga Platense playing for Club Comunidad Rural, where he was twice leading goal scorer and champion - before passing to Villa San Carlos.

Professional career

Villa San Carlos
Portillo joined Villa San Carlos for the 2018–19 season. In his first season with Villa San Carlos, he achieved promotion from the Primera C to the Primera B, noting six goals. In 2019, Portillo came off of the bench in the second half to score a double in a home victory against Dock Suck in the league's reduced semi-final. In February 2021, Argentina's TyC Sports reported that Gimnasia La Plata were interested in Portillo. Portillo mentioned the negotiations with Gimnasia LP fell through.

Deportivo Riestra
On 15 February 2021, Portillo joined Primera B Nacional side Deportivo Riestra on loan until 31 December. His loan runs until January 2022. Portillo arrived at the club with the option to be bought. He was eyed by Estudiantes de Caseros and Almirante Brown before signing with Deportivo Riestra. Portillo was still to find in Riestra during 2022.

Style of play
In 2021, Portillo told Paraguayan newspaper Cronica that as an attacker, he always watches videos of Paraguayan strikers Roque Santa Cruz and Nelson Haedo Valdez.

Notes

References

External links
 
 
 
 
 

1994 births
Living people
Argentine footballers
Association football forwards
Club Atlético Villa San Carlos footballers
Deportivo Riestra players
Primera B Metropolitana players
Primera Nacional players